Maxim Alekseyevich Kitsyn (born December 24, 1991) is a Russian professional ice hockey player currently under contract with Metallurg Novokuznetsk of the Supreme Hockey League (VHL). He has previously played in the Kontinental Hockey League with Metallurg Novokuznetsk,  Torpedo Nizhny Novgorod and Admiral Vladivostok.

Playing career
Kitsyn was drafted 158th overall in 2010 by the Los Angeles Kings. On July 10, 2013, Kitsyn was signed to a three-year entry level contract with the Kings.

In his three years within the Kings organization, Kitsyn was unable to make an impact at the North American level and as an impending restricted free agent opted to return to Russia in signing a one-year deal for a second tenure with Torpedo Nizhny Novgorod on May 25, 2016.

After an unsuccessful second tenure with Torpedo in the 2016–17 season, Kitsyn was released as a free agent and signed a one-year pact with his third KHL club, Admiral Vladivostok, on July 9, 2017.

Following the 2017–18 season, having played in just 16 games with Admiral, Kitsyn was released as a free agent and agreed to a one-year contract with VHL club, Saryarka Karaganda, on August 14, 2018.

Career statistics

Regular season and playoffs

References

External links

1991 births
Living people
Admiral Vladivostok players
Kuznetskie Medvedi players
Los Angeles Kings draft picks
Manchester Monarchs (AHL) players
Manchester Monarchs (ECHL) players
Metallurg Novokuznetsk players
Mississauga St. Michael's Majors players
Ontario Reign (AHL) players
Ontario Reign (ECHL) players
People from Novokuznetsk
Russian ice hockey left wingers
HC Sarov players
Saryarka Karagandy players
Torpedo Nizhny Novgorod players
Yermak Angarsk players
Yuzhny Ural Orsk players
Sportspeople from Kemerovo Oblast